Violet Gray is a fictional character featured in the long-running syndicated daily and Sunday comic strip Peanuts, created by Charles M. Schulz. Violet first appeared in the February 7, 1951 strip. She was originally a major character, until she was eventually relegated to background and cameo appearances.

Violet is best known as a bit of a snob who likes bragging and, along with Lucy and her best friend Patty, often teases and torments Charlie Brown. She bullies other characters in the strip, particularly "Pig-Pen" and Charlie Brown.

In addition to the comic strip, Violet has appeared alongside other Peanuts characters in numerous Peanuts television specials, cinematic movies, theatrical plays, and video games.

History 
Violet first appeared in the February 7, 1951 Peanuts strip. From there on, Violet's character changed and developed until the 1960s, when she began to be seen less often than the other major characters, with her  appearances eventually reduced to  the background and cameos. Her last appearance was in the November 27, 1997 Peanuts strip.

Appearance 
As Violet's character developed over the years, her appearance changed as well. In the early strips, Violet has her shoulder-length black hair kept in either pigtails, a bun, or, sometimes, a ponytail. Later on, Schulz dropped the braids and kept Violet's hair only in ponytails. Violet also wears front bangs and often wears dresses which are originally depicted as purple; later they were depicted as lime green, as well as black Mary Janes shoes. Violet wears her purple dress in The Peanuts Movie, which is consistent with her name ("violet" is French for "purple").

Personality 
Violet is smart, popular, tomboyish, and somewhat of a snob. She makes her opinions known to everyone, and her haughtiness causes her to often torment other people, whom she views as beneath her.

Compared to the apparent middle-class upbringing of the other characters, Violet is supposedly of upper-class mentality, and she likes to brag about how her father possesses something her friends' fathers don't; it is also implied, however, that Violet's father is often absent from her life, which her peers use against her when she gets too obnoxious. For example, in a Father's Day strip, her boasts are quelled by Charlie Brown when he takes her to his dad's barbershop. After telling her about how his dad would always smile at him no matter how bad a workday he was having, a moved and humbled Violet walked away, but not before quietly wishing Charlie Brown a Happy Father's Day. In another example, a character named "5" fired back at her with "My dad goes to PTA meetings!" Charlie Brown once deflated her with the comeback: "My dad has a son."

In the early strips, Violet often acted like a preschool-age Suzy Homemaker: frequently making mud pies, playing "house," and being linked to romantic scenarios involving Shermy or  Charlie Brown. In a strip from 1954, she is shown to collect stamps as a hobby. On some occasions, Violet was shown walking and keeping company with Lucy.

Her surname (Gray) was mentioned only once, on April 4, 1953.

Violet's personality was much more forceful and recognizable compared to the more generic early Peanuts characters like Patty and Shermy, which allowed her to survive slightly longer than those founding characters when a new wave of characters; Linus, Lucy, and Schroeder; were introduced (as an example, Violet has key roles in the TV specials A Charlie Brown Christmas and It's the Great Pumpkin, Charlie Brown). By the 1960s, however, Violet, too, was largely phased out with the introduction of the next wave of characters (Peppermint Patty, Marcie, Franklin and such). Schulz admitted in a 1988 interview that Violet's pure vindictiveness had made it difficult to give her punch lines. Speaking of her, Patty and Shermy: "Some characters just don't seem to have enough personality to carry out ideas. They're just almost born straight men." Schulz also contrasted Violet to Lucy in that where Violet was purely mean, Lucy had redeeming characteristics of being bluntly honest and to-the-point, and thus Lucy "worked" as a more rounded character where Violet did not. Violet's use in the strip was eventually reduced to appearances in the background.

Relationship with other Peanuts characters

Interactions with Charlie Brown 
Violet often teased Charlie Brown (often adding a series of "Nyah!"s), who often makes comebacks. In an example of such, Violet once said to him, "It simply goes without saying that you are an inferior human being."  His adroit reply to this was, "If it goes without saying, why did you have to say it?" She, along with Patty, do not invite him to their parties and enjoyed tormenting him with this. Charlie Brown is usually depressed by this, but sometimes he decides to turn the tables on the two girls.  For example:
 November 23, 1951:  When they mentioned excluding Charlie Brown from their party, he let it roll off his back saying he did not want to go to their "dumb ol' party" anyway. After he left, they pondered whether he meant it. Violet was convinced he did, so Patty suggested "In that case, maybe we'd better invite him."
 January 29, 1954:  Charlie Brown replied to them saying if they did not like him they were better off not inviting him. Stunned to silence, the girls just walked away, with Charlie Brown smiling after them.
 September 1, 1954:  Charlie Brown uncharacteristically threatened to strafe, then bomb their house if he was not invited, to which both girls replied, "Okay, you're invited."
In early strips, Violet was linked to romantic scenarios involving Shermy or Charlie Brown. She also feels bad for Charlie Brown when he doesn't get a Valentine's Day card in Be My Valentine, Charlie Brown, which hints that she cares about him deep down (this caring is inconsistent; when he doesn't receive a Christmas card in A Charlie Brown Christmas, Violet responds in her usual mocking tone).

Although Charlie Brown was the usual recipient of Violet's cruelty, he was not the only one.  One memorable Sunday strip of September 20, 1959, featured her hurling a series of virulent insults at Lucy (so venomous that Charlie Brown remarked that he was glad she wasn't yelling at him, because he wouldn't have been able to take it), although Lucy ultimately won this battle by unleashing her own string of rapid-fire insults at Violet, causing Violet to walk away in shock.  Nor was Linus immune - one 1961 strip involved Violet and Patty mocking Linus for carrying a blanket (to which Linus responded by wrapping himself in his blanket and doing an impression of Count Dracula, leading both girls to flee in terror). Violet and Lucy insult 'Pig-Pen' in various comic strips and specials.

Violet also is often prone to using physical violence against Charlie Brown in various comics. Some examples are:

 April 4, 1953, Violet Gray punches Charlie Brown on top of his head after he says, "Ol' tattletale Gray, huh?"
August 4, 1963, an angry Violet is seen chasing Charlie Brown, threatening to "knock (his) block off". Before she can throw a punch, Charlie Brown stops her and tries to reason with her, saying that there are better ways to solve problems than with violence. Unfazed, Violet ends up punching him in the middle of his speech, and in the final panel admits to Patty, "I had to hit him quick. He was beginning to make sense!"

Interactions with Patty 
Violet and Patty were friends, and would be seen walking about with each other, talking, and making mud pies. Despite this, not all their interactions were friendly, as on April 4, 1953, Patty calls Violet a 'tattletale' and storms off.

Interactions with Lucy van Pelt 
Violet and Lucy were also close friends, and would be seen together sometimes accompanied by Patty teasing Charlie Brown in the TV specials and films, or walking and talking with each other in them and the comics. Sometimes, they wouldn't be too friendly towards each other as in one strip they were verbally fighting each other with insults, in which Lucy won.

Interactions with 'Pig-Pen' 
Violet always insults "Pig-Pen". For example, in a strip Violet attempts to shame 'Pig-Pen' by making him look in a mirror and she asks him, "Aren't you ashamed?" to which 'Pig-Pen' replies, "On the contrary. I didn't think I looked this good." He also told Violet "I forgot to rake my hair" when she mocked him for having leaves on his head in a strip from November 16, 1984. In the Peanuts educational computer game, It's the Big Game, Charlie Brown, 'Pig-Pen' says that he is in love with Violet, due to her habit of making mud pies. However, this has never been stated in the comic strip, and therefore cannot be considered canon. But it has been hinted in the strip, for example, in one early strip, 'Pig-Pen' cleans up after seeing Violet hug Snoopy, complaining that no one ever hugged him this way, to impress her and possibly get a hug.

Interactions with Shermy 
Shermy and Violet were seen talking a few times, for example in a strip where Charlie Brown is called to the office and comes back as a safety patrol member, they discuss it. In early strips, there was hint at a love rivalry between him, Charlie, and Violet. In the strip from January 9, 1952, Shermy claims that Violet is the prettiest girl in the world. However, Charlie Brown rides on a sled with Snoopy running, yelling "MUSH! MUSH!" It is presumed Violet thought Shermy was lying, as in the next panel Shermy beats up Charlie Brown. However, in 1959, where Violet talks to Charlie Brown at the wall, she says that Shermy should be her friend, but he just isn't.

Interactions with Snoopy 
Violet has a good relationship with Snoopy and unlike Lucy, she is not afraid to be licked or kissed by him. In one strip, Lucy lashes out at the dog, but Violet comforts him and hugs him. Violet can frequently be seen cuddling with Snoopy, especially in the 50's.

Voiced by

Sally Dryer (1963, 1965)
Karen Mendelson (1966)
Ann Altieri (1966–1969)
Linda Ercoli (1972, 1975)
Roseline Rubens (1980)
Stacy Ferguson (1985)
Deanna Tello (1992)
Ashley Edner (2000)
Kaitlyn Maggio (2003)
Jolean Wejbe (2006)
Taya Calicetto (2008–2009)
Blesst Bowden (2011)
Madisyn Shipman (2015)
Charlie Boyle (2021-present)

Notes

External links
 First appearance of Violet, Peanuts, 7 February 1951

Peanuts characters
Comics characters introduced in 1951
Child characters in comics
Female characters in animation
Female characters in comics
Fictional bullies
Child characters in television